Semmiona is a genus of leaf beetles in the subfamily Eumolpinae. It is known from Africa.

Species
 Semmiona chapuisi (Jacoby, 1900)
 Semmiona favareli (Achard, 1914)
 Semmiona squameoguttata Fairmaire, 1885
 Semmiona squamulosa (Chapuis, 1874)
 Semmiona woodi Bryant, 1941

References

Eumolpinae
Chrysomelidae genera
Beetles of Africa
Taxa named by Léon Fairmaire